Protosilvanus granosus, is a species of silvan flat bark beetle found in India, Sri Lanka, Malaysia, Singapore,
Indonesia, Philippines and Solomon Islands.

Description
Average length of the adult is about 2.3 to 2.9 mm. Body elongate, and dorsally flattened. Dorsum reddish-brown in color, and covered with short pubescence. Antennae moderately long, where the segments 9 and 10 are transverse and without apical spines on sides. Vertex with coarse and dense puncturation. Prothorax elongate.

References 

Silvanidae
Insects of Sri Lanka
Insects of India
Insects described in 1897